= Equestrian at the 1958 British Empire and Commonwealth Games =

- Venue: Ninian Park, Cardiff
- Date: May 7

Medalists
gold medal	(England) Fred Williams

Showjumping was a demonstration sport at the 1958 Commonwealth Games, taking place at Ninian Park on the 7th May in the lead up to the main games.

Show jumper Fred Williams of Loughborough, Leicestershire, won the Championship Cup with his mounts Pegasus, Huntsman and Dumbell.

This is the first time Equestrian has featured at the Commonwealth Games.
